Era News is a satellite cable news channel operated by Era Television in Taiwan, launched in October 1996 (as GOGO TV).

External links
 

Television channels and stations established in 1996
24-hour television news channels in Taiwan
Television news in Taiwan